Marunouchi is a commercial district located in Chiyoda, Tokyo, Japan. Situated between Tokyo Station and the Imperial Palace, the name, meaning "inside the circle", derives from its location within the palace's outer moat. It is also Tokyo's financial district and the country's three largest banks are headquartered there.

History
In 1590, before shogun Tokugawa Ieyasu entered Edo Castle, the area now known as Marunouchi was an inlet of Edo Bay and had the name Hibiya. With the expansion of the castle, this inlet was filled, beginning in 1592.

A new outer moat was constructed, and the earlier moat became the inner moat. The area took the name Okuruwauchi ("within the enclosure").

Daimyōs, particularly shinpan and fudai, constructed their mansions here, and with 24 such estates, the area also became known as daimyō kōji ("daimyō alley"). The offices of the North and South Magistrates, and that of the Finance Magistrate, were also here.

Following the Meiji Restoration, Marunouchi came under control of the national government, which erected barracks and parade grounds for the army.

Those moved in 1890, and Iwasaki Yanosuke, brother of the founder (and later the second leader) of Mitsubishi, purchased the land for 1.5 million yen. As the company developed the land, it came to be known as Mitsubishi-ga-hara (the "Mitsubishi Fields").

Much of the land remains under the control of Mitsubishi Estate, and the headquarters of many companies in the Mitsubishi Group are in Marunouchi.

The government of Tokyo constructed its headquarters on the site of the former Kōchi han in 1894. They moved it to the present Tokyo Metropolitan Government Building in Shinjuku in 1991, and the new Tokyo International Forum and Toyota Tsusho Corporation now stands on the site. Nearly a quarter of Japan's GDP is generated in this area.

Tokyo Station opened in 1914, and the Marunouchi Building in 1923.  Tokyo Station reopened on 1 October 2012 after a 5 year refurbishment.

Much of the area was damaged in the deadly 1974 Mitsubishi Heavy Industries bombing.

Places in Marunouchi

Marunouchi Oazo
Marunouchi Building
Shin-Marunouchi Building
Tokyo Central Post Office (closed)
Tokyo International Forum
Mitsubishi Ichigokan Museum, Tokyo
Tokyo Station, the city's main intercity rail terminal
Meiji Seimei Kan

Tallest Buildings 130m+

Companies based in Marunouchi

Calbee has its headquarters in the Marunouchi Trust Tower Main. Konica Minolta has its headquarters in the Marunouchi Center Building in Marunouchi.

Mitsubishi Group companies:
The Bank of Tokyo-Mitsubishi UFJ
Meiji Yasuda Life Insurance
Mitsubishi Corporation
Mitsubishi Heavy Industries
Mitsubishi Electric
Nippon Yusen
Tokio Marine Nichido
Asahi Glass
Hitachi
Furukawa Electric
Nikko Citigroup
Ushio, Inc.
Tanaka Kikinzoku Group

Marunouchi also houses the Japan offices of Aeroméxico (Pacific Century Place Marunouchi), Bain & Company, Bayerische Landes Bank, Bloomberg, First National Bank of Boston, BT Group, Citigroup, Banca Commerciale Italiana, Deloitte Touche Tohmatsu, Bank of India, JPMorgan Chase, KPMG, Latham & Watkins, Mellon Bank, Morgan, Lewis & Bockius, Morrison & Foerster, NatWest Group, Nikko Cordial, Nikko Citigroup, Rabobank, Bank Negara Indonesia, Overseas Union Bank, Philadelphia National Bank, PricewaterhouseCoopers, Ropes & Gray, Royal Insurance, Standard Chartered Bank and Standard & Poor's.

Japan Airlines used to have its headquarters in the Tokyo Building in Marunouchi.

Rail and subway stations
Nijūbashimae Station (Chiyoda Line)
Otemachi Station (Chiyoda Line, Hanzomon Line, Marunouchi Line, Toei Mita Line, Tozai Line)
Tokyo Station (Chūō Line, Keihin-Tohoku Line, Keiyo Line, Marunouchi Line, Shinkansen, Sōbu Line, Yamanote Line, Yokosuka Line)

Education
 operates public elementary and junior high schools. Chiyoda Elementary School (千代田小学校) is the zoned elementary of Marunouchi 1-3 chōme. There is a freedom of choice system for junior high schools in Chiyoda Ward, and so there are no specific junior high school zones.

References

External links

 

 
Chiyoda, Tokyo
Neighborhoods of Tokyo